William Walter Stewart King (1 February 1898 – 10 March 1962) was a Scottish amateur footballer who played as a wing half in the Scottish League for Queen's Park. He represented Scotland as a full and amateur international.

References

External links 

 

Scottish footballers
Scotland international footballers
Queen's Park F.C. players
Scotland amateur international footballers
1898 births
1962 deaths
Footballers from Glasgow
Association football wing halves
Place of death missing